Santa Engrácia (English: Saint Engratia) is a former parish (freguesia) in the municipality of Lisbon, Portugal. At the administrative reorganization of Lisbon on 8 December 2012 it became part of the parish São Vicente. It has a total area of 0.57 km2 and total population of 5,860 inhabitants (2001); density: 10,335.1 inhabitants/km2.

The parish was created in 1959, after the Santo Estêvao de Alfama de-annexation. The parish name was intended to honor the catholic martyr Santa Engracia of Zaragoza, later on the King Manuel I daughter, Infanta Maria built a church in the parish to receive a reliquary of the said martyr. After being almost destroyed by a severe storm, the church was rebuilt and eventually received the National Pantheon classification.

Main sites
Palha Palace (also called Van Zeller Palace or Pancas Palace)
Veloso Rebelo Palhares Palace
Nossa Senhora da Porciúncula Church (also called Barbadinhos Church)
Santa Apolónia Station

External links
 Santa Engrácia's parish website

References 

Former parishes of Lisbon